Alison Drennan (born 30 January 1991) is an Australian rules footballer playing for Gold Coast in the AFL Women's (AFLW). She has previously played for North Melbourne and St Kilda.

AFLW career

North Melbourne
Drennan was signed by North Melbourne as a free agent during the expansion club signing period in 2018. She made her debut in the club's inaugural match, a 36-point victory over Carlton at North Hobart Oval in the opening round of the 2019 season.

St Kilda
Ahead of the 2020 season, Drennan was signed by expansion club St Kilda.

Gold Coast
In August 2020, Drennan was traded to Gold Coast in exchange for the 24th pick of the 2020 AFL Women's draft, which Gold Coast secured from Brisbane in exchange for Taylor Smith.

References

External links 

1991 births
Living people
North Melbourne Football Club (AFLW) players
Australian rules footballers from Victoria (Australia)
St Kilda Football Club (AFLW) players
Gold Coast Football Club (AFLW) players